Streptomyces anthocyanicus is a bacterium species from the genus of  Streptomyces which was isolated from soil.

See also
 List of Streptomyces species

References

Further reading

External links
Type strain of Streptomyces anthocyanicus at BacDive -  the Bacterial Diversity Metadatabase

anthocyanicus
Bacteria described in 1970